Psyche Looking at Love is a white marble statue produced by Auguste Rodin, drawing on the Cupid and Psyche myth.

Variants
First conceived around 1885, it is known in several variants - for example, a 1906 autograph copy is now in the Museo Soumaya in Mexico City.

See also
List of sculptures by Auguste Rodin

References

External links

Sculptures by Auguste Rodin
1906 sculptures
Sculptures of the Museo Soumaya
Marble sculptures
Works based on The Golden Ass